Star Island is a neighborhood in the city of Miami Beach on a man-made island in Biscayne Bay, Florida, United States.  The island is south of the Venetian Islands and just east of Palm and Hibiscus islands.

Background
The name “Star Island” is thought to have originated from the fact that many of the homes on the island were once owned by famous celebrities and high-profile individuals, giving the island a “star-studded” reputation. Completed in 1922 by the Army Corps of Engineers by dredging sand, the land was initially owned by developer Carl Fisher, who purchased several land parcels of what would become the city of Miami Beach.  It is accessible by land and barrier islands via the MacArthur Causeway.

Education
Students from Star Island are served by the following schools of the Miami-Dade County Public Schools:
 South Pointe Elementary School
 Nautilus Middle School
 Miami Beach High School

Celebrity residents
Celebrities who own or have owned homes on the island include Edward Howland Robinson Green, Enrique Iglesias, Sean Combs, Emilio and Gloria Estefan, Don Johnson, Rosie O'Donnell, Xuxa, Shaquille O'Neal, and Phillip Frost. Tour guides and realtors have made false claims of some other celebrities having homes on Star Island, such as LeBron James, Rihanna, Jennifer Lopez,  Julio Iglesias, Madonna, Sylvester Stallone and Elizabeth Taylor.

Rosie O’Donnell’s Star Island house (purchased in 1999) was the subject of a 1979 trial in which prosecutors alleged that it was being used by members of the Ethiopian Zion Coptic Church to run a marijuana smuggling ring. Some scenes from the 1994 movie The Specialist were filmed there.

References

Islands of Miami Beach, Florida
Neighborhoods in Miami Beach, Florida
Gated communities in Florida